The Archbishop of Dublin may refer to:

 Archbishop of Dublin – an article which lists of pre- and post-Reformation archbishops.
 Archbishop of Dublin (Catholic Church) – the title of the senior cleric who presides over the Roman Catholic Archdiocese of Dublin.
 Archbishop of Dublin (Church of Ireland) – the title of the senior cleric who presides over the Church of Ireland Diocese of Dublin and Glendalough.

See also
 Roman Catholic Archdiocese of Dublin – the Metropolitan Archdiocese of Dublin is a Roman Catholic archdiocese in the eastern part of the Republic of Ireland.  
Diocese of Dublin and Glendalough – a diocese in the Church of Ireland.
 Primacy of Ireland – an honorary title of the Archbishop of Dublin. Used by both denominations.